Chopsticks are eating utensils mainly employed in Asia. "Chopsticks" may also refer to:
 "Chopsticks" (music), a simple piano piece
 Flohwalzer, a different piano piece often called "Chopsticks" in the United Kingdom
 Chopsticks (album), a 1989 album by Peter Combe
 Chopsticks (hand game), a finger game
 The Chopsticks, a female singing duo from Hong Kong
 Hashiwokakero, a logic puzzle sometimes mistranslated as "chopsticks"
 The Civilian War Memorial in Singapore, informally known as "Chopsticks"
 Chopsticks (2019 film), an Indian film
 Chopstick, Slang for a gun